José López Portillo y Rojas (May 26, 1850 – May 22, 1923), born in Guadalajara, Jalisco, was a Mexican lawyer, politician and man of letters. He served as Governor of Jalisco in 1911 and as Secretary of Foreign Affairs in 1914 for coup leader and brief Mexican President Victoriano Huerta, during the United States occupation of Veracruz. He served as Director of the Mexican Academy of Language from 1916 to 1923.

His grandson José López Portillo y Pacheco, was the president of Mexico from 1976 to 1982.

Works
Novels
La Parcela (1898)
Los Precursores (1909)
Fuertes y débiles (1919)
La Horma de Su Zapato
Essays and stories
Seis Leyendas (1883) 
Novelas Cortas (1900)
Sucesos y Novelas Cortas (1903)
Historias, Historietas y Cuentecillos (1918)

References
José López Portillo y Rojas (SRE biography)

External links
 

1850 births
1923 deaths
19th-century Mexican writers
19th-century male writers
Writers from Guadalajara, Jalisco
Mexican Secretaries of Foreign Affairs
Governors of Jalisco
Members of the Mexican Academy of Language